Ramazzotti is an Italian digestivo bitter liqueur Amaro, bottled at 30% alcohol by volume. It is bottled in Canelli by Pernod Ricard.

External links

 http://www.ramazzotti.it/

Italian liqueurs
Bitters
Italian brands
Pernod Ricard brands